The Providencia vireo (Vireo approximans) is a species of bird in the family Vireonidae. It is endemic to Isla de Providencia. Its natural habitats are subtropical or tropical moist lowland forests, subtropical or tropical moist montane forests, plantations, and heavily degraded former forest. It is threatened by habitat loss. It is sometimes considered a subspecies of the thick-billed vireo.

References

Providencia vireo
Providencia vireo
Taxa named by Robert Ridgway
Endemic birds of the Caribbean